Marampatti is a Panchayat Village in Uthangarai taluk in the Krishnagiri District of the Indian state of Tamil Nadu.

Demographics
According to the 2001 Indian census, Marampatti had a population of 1,012. Males constitute 52% of the population and females 48%. Marampatti has an average literacy rate of 52%.

STD Code :04341

School(s) in Marampatti
Name and address of the School 
 Govt Panchayat Middle School, Marampatti

Number of Villages Under Marampatti Panchayat: 4 
Panchayat Villages:
 MARAMPATTI
 KANAMPATTI
 NAAPIRAMPATTI
 MALLAMPATTI

Marampatti
Marampatti is a village, 6 miles from uthangarai. Marampatti is a panchayat , 4 villages coming under Marampatti panchayat.

Pambar Reservoir
Pambar reservoir has constructed during the old age after independence. This dam is near from uthangarai. It has get surrounded by the nearby villages. The one which is Marampatti Village. It is a beautiful village with green Coconut and mango trees.

Images of Pambar Reservoir

References

2. http://bp1.blogger.com/_oJ22GUE1ZNg/R9ux-ZfLB2I/AAAAAAAAAAM/dWyP5ZXlBt8/s1600-h/map.jpg

3. https://web.archive.org/web/20121106033915/http://picasaweb.google.com/sekarc1984/MyNativePlace?feat=directlink

Villages in Krishnagiri district